C. Motamma (born 20 March 1951) better known by name Motamma, is an Indian politician from the state of Karnataka. She was a Leader of the Opposition in Karnataka Legislative Council  from 2010 to 2012. She's the first woman to be Leader of the Opposition in Karnataka Legislative Council & She also served as Minister for Women & Child Welfare in S. M. Krishna Cabinet.

Early life and education
Motamma was born as fourth child and third daughter, She has one elder brother and two elder sisters, She wasn't named her name until she joined Primary School near Maggalamakki, Mudigere, which was started newly, her nickname Motu became her name as Motamma.
She did her high school in Chikmagalur. PUC, B.A. in Maharani College Bangalore, and M.A. in the Bangalore University and it was first Co-Ed College.

Political career
She represented Mudigere in 1978, 1989 and 1999. She was Member of Legislative Council from 2006 to 2012. She again got elected to Member of Legislative Council on 18 June 2012.

Personal life
She married Venkataraman. It was Love-cum-Arrange Marriage, they have a daughter and two sons. 
Her marriage was attended by then Prime Minister of India Indira Gandhi.

References

1951 births
Living people
Indian National Congress politicians from Karnataka
Members of the Karnataka Legislative Council
Indian National Congress politicians
Leaders of the Opposition in the Karnataka Legislative Council
Karnataka MLAs 1978–1983
Karnataka MLAs 1989–1994
Karnataka MLAs 1999–2004